The 1976 Brantford municipal election was held on December 6, 1976, to elect a mayor, councillors, and school trustees in Brantford, Ontario, Canada. The rural and small-town communities near Brantford also held elections on the same day.

Charles Bowen was elected to a third two-year term as mayor of Brantford.

Results

Ernie Fish was active with the Brant Naval Veterans Association. He was, like Dave Neumann, supported by the United Auto Workers.
Wynn Harding was elected to the Brantford City Council in 1974 but was defeated in 1976. She later worked as a freelance writer and was active with the University Women's Club of Brantford.

James Friel was the father of Chris Friel, who served as mayor of Brantford from 1994 to 2003 and was elected to the same position again in 2010. James died of lung cancer at age forty-three, due in large part to a lifelong habit of heavy smoking. In 2002, Chris Friel cited his father's illness and death as reasons for supporting a municipal anti-smoking by-law.

References

1976 elections in Canada
1976
1976 in Ontario